Newton Isaac Collins Sr. (February 11, 1826 – September 7, 1903) was an African-American freed slave from Alabama who moved to Travis County, Texas, in the 1840s, where he was re-enslaved. After the Emancipation Proclamation, Collins again received his freedom and became a businessman, land owner and community leader in southeastern Travis County.

Biography 
His mother was an African-American slave; his father was their owner, Silas Collins, who manumitted the young Collins at an early age and saw to it that he was educated and apprenticed in carpentry. After his father's death in the 1840s, Collins moved to the area that is now Manor, Texas, where he was re-enslaved by a family named Parsons. In 1854, he married Sarah Elizabeth Harrington, a fellow literate slave on the Parson estate, with whom he eventually had eight children.

With the promulgation of the Emancipation Proclamation in Texas on June 19, 1865, Collins again received his freedom. He then developed a carpentry business constructing houses and churches around Travis County, Texas.

As Collins and his adult children's families settled in the area, he built and furnished a one-room school and a Methodist church to serve the community, and he hired a teacher and preacher to operate them. Collins died in Austin on September 7, 1903, and was buried in the Collins Cemetery on his family land in Pilot Knob.

Newton Collins Elementary School in Easton Park, Austin, is named after Collins. It is thought to be the first modern school in Central Texas named for a former slave.

References 

19th-century African-American people
19th-century American businesspeople
19th-century American slaves
1826 births
1903 deaths
African-American businesspeople
American carpenters
American freedmen
Free Negroes
Literate American slaves
People from Alabama
20th-century African-American people